Father of Bossa Nova is an epithet held by several pioneers of bossa nova. It may refer to:

 João Gilberto (1931–2019), Brazilian musician
 Johnny Alf (1929–2010), Brazilian musician
 Tom Jobim (1927–1994), Brazilian musician

See also

 List of bossa nova standards
 Bossa nova (disambiguation)

References

Bossa nova
Nicknames in music